Angry Boys is an Australian television mockumentary miniseries written by and starring Chris Lilley, continuing the mockumentary style of his previous series. In Angry Boys, Lilley plays multiple characters: S.mouse, an American rapper; Jen, a manipulative Japanese mother; Blake Oakfield, a champion surfer; Ruth "Gran" Sims, a guard at a juvenile detention facility; and her teenage grandsons, South Australian twins Daniel and Nathan Sims.

The series is a co-production between the Australian Broadcasting Corporation and US cable channel HBO, with a pre-sale to BBC Three in the United Kingdom. Filmed in Melbourne, Los Angeles and Tokyo, Angry Boys premièred on 11 May 2011 at 9:00 pm on ABC1.

Production

Development 
Executive producers Chris Lilley and Laura Waters brought together the same team of collaborators from Summer Heights High and We Can Be Heroes to create six characters for the series. This included the casting director, director of photography, camera operators, art department, costume designer, make-up artist, location scout, 1st assistant director, composer and editor. On 25 August 2009, The Daily Telegraph reported that Lilley had planned to release a follow-up series to Summer Heights High, after years of working on the format. A casting call was held on 30 September 2009 for roles of an African-American female (aged 18–25) to play a model called LaFonda, an African-American male, (aged 50–65) to play a character called Carter, and a male Japanese-American professional skateboarder, (aged 16–20) to play Corey. On 2 October 2009, it was revealed that Lilley was searching for several American actors to appear in the series. The Australian Broadcasting Corporation (ABC) also released details about the series, confirming that it would be called Angry Boys, and that it would be co-produced by the ABC and American network HBO.

More than 3,500 people auditioned for roles, both actors and non-actors from Australia and overseas to find a wide range of looks, attitudes, races and ages for 89 main roles and 1,228 extras. Angry Boys was filmed over seven months in more than 70 locations across Australia, Los Angeles and Tokyo. The series was edited over a period of 12 months. A preview of the series premiered on 16 March 2011, introducing some of the new characters, and the return of identical twins Daniel and Nathan Sims from We Can Be Heroes. A preview was also shown during the Comic Relief benefit in the United Kingdom on 18 March 2011. During an interview with The Age in May 2011, Waters said that they wanted the series to be a "challenge" to make it more "fun" and believes that they have "taken everything to the next level". Angry Boys premiered on 11 May 2011 at 9:00 pm on ABC1.

Music 
The theme music to Angry Boys was written and produced by Lilley. Bryony Marks, who had been involved in some of the music from Summer Heights High, had helped Lilley arrange the theme music and produced all the incidental music in it. It was recorded over a number of sessions with the Melbourne Symphony Orchestra, with Lilley on grand piano for some pieces.
Lilley also wrote and produced all the songs for the series, including S.mouse's rap songs, and recorded them in his home studio.

Characters
There are six main characters featured in Angry Boys, all portrayed by Chris Lilley.

Daniel and Nathan Sims 
Recurring characters from an earlier Chris Lilley series, We Can Be Heroes, Nathan and Daniel are identical 17-year-old twins living on a small farm with their family in the fictional rural town of Dunt, South Australia; Daniel has been the man of the house since their dad died when they were 11. His dream is to rebuild the farm as a working sheep farm and run it with Nathan. Daniel and his mates enjoy doing mainies up and down Dunt's main street using his mum's Nissan Pulsar car. Nathan has only 10% of his hearing and is quiet, lonely and constantly harassed by Daniel; his response to everything is giving the finger. In the twins' bedroom is the "Wall of Legends," pictures of the people they consider their heroes: surfer Blake Oakfield; Japanese skater Tim Okazaki; US rapper S.mouse; bikini model Emily Chase; their late dad; and their Gran.

During the show, Nathan makes a tribute video to S.mouse's song, "Poo on You" and gets himself in trouble with the local Dunt police. His hearing condition worsens and the authorities suggest that he should be sent to a deaf school in Adelaide for a two-year course. Daniel organizes a "legendary" farewell party for Nathan and, enlisting Gran's help, invites all their "Wall of Legends" heroes.  Later it's revealed, as she tells Daniel via Skype, that her worsening dementia causes her to forget to invite them. But much to everyone's surprise, Oakfield, Okazaki, and S.mouse actually do show up at the party.

S.mouse 

S.mouse (born Shwayne Jnr.) is a 24-year-old African American rap artist from Los Angeles. He is known for releasing the biggest-selling hip hop single of all time, "Slap My Elbow." Claiming to have been an "underprivileged black kid from the slums," it is revealed by his father, Shwayne Snr. (Richard Lawson), he comes from a wealthy suburban background in Calabasas, California and that he went to a predominantly white private school, sang gospel music at church, and begged him for the Wicked soundtrack. S.mouse spends most of his time hanging out with his best friend Danthony (Clyde Boraine).

During the show, S.mouse finds himself under pressure from his record company over his self-penned YouTube-released song, "Poo on You," the music video for which features him defecating on a police car. He later makes an online apology to his fans and is put under house arrest at his parents' house for two months, during which he receives a demo of the record company's song "Gingerbread S.mouse" and expresses great dislike of the track. He then decides to release a new single called "Grandmother Fucker." The song's music video features an appearance by S.mouse's grandmother, which angers his father. Later his manager phones to inform him that he has been dropped from the record company due to the video receiving a large number of complaints.

S.mouse then sets up a home studio to work on his own music for his new album, The Real Me, to be produced by Danthony and released independently. Following the album's launch to a largely nonplussed crowd, S.mouse realizes that he isn't really expressing the real him and decides to read Daniel's letter about an Aborigine child named Wally who was crushed by a truck. He writes a song about the incident called "Squashed Nigga" and decides to sing the song instead of rapping it. Following the song's release, S.mouse re-invents himself under the name Shwayne Jnr.

Jen Okazaki 
Jen Okazaki is a soft-spoken Japanese wife and mother of three who moved with her family from Japan to Santa Barbara, California in the United States for a better life. She focuses mainly on turning her first son Tim Okazaki into a skateboarding champion. Deciding that she can promote his career better from Tokyo, she moves the family back to Japan. She markets him not only as a cute Japanese boy but also a homosexual. She builds a successful empire around Tim's skateboarding success, "GayStyle Enterprises," in which she sells phallic whistles, perfume dispensers, water bottles and scrubbing brushes.

During the show, Jen takes Tim to doctors and finds out that he is overworked and depressed. She tries to get him more relaxed and decides to take on some of his responsibilities. She also gets him a dog she names "Gay Dog" which she claims is "the first ever gay dog." Jen wants him to become best friends with the Gay Dog and to teach him how to skate. Later on, Tim reveals to his fans on his website that he is straight and has a girlfriend with whom he has been having a secret relationship for several months. In a fit of anger Jen runs away from home leaving a note behind which threatens that she will kill herself and Gay Dog if Tim doesn't reclaim he is gay. Jen is later dumped as Tim's manager and is replaced by Bruce (Billy Loh). They all move back to Santa Barbara and live in separate houses.  Tim gets his own home near the beach and buys a single-family residence for Jen, his father, and his two younger siblings.  Jen does not enjoy the suburban lifestyle and hates being a stay-at-home mom. Not accepting defeat, Jen begins training her second son, Luke, to become the next golfing superstar.

Gran 
Ruth Sims, commonly referred to as "Gran," is Daniel and Nathan's 65-year-old grandmother who works as a prison officer at the Sydney Garingal Juvenile Justice Centre for teenage boys, where she has been employed for 25 years. She lives in a house on the premises with her co-worker Penny (Alison Roy). Gran describes herself as being "tough" and likes to think she is a mother figure for the inmates. She demonstrates her feelings of love and care in myriad ways, for example through insults and swearing in a manner similar to that of a drill sergeant.  She does, however, care deeply for the boys and serves as a confidant. Gran also looks after 23 guinea pigs; Pauline, Patch, Lucy, Henry, Fudge, Narelle, Jaffles, Kerry Anne, Ken, Ruffles, Princess Mary, Courtney, Keith, Pia and the Babies, Trizzy, Joyce, Darrel, Sonia, Ratty, Bok Choy and Parsley. Her favorite is named after the television presenter Kerri-Anne.

During the show she displays a lack of political correctness, during the first episode she divides the inmates into two teams of "light skins" and "dark skins" for a football game. She makes statements like, "I thought wogs were good at soccer." and "Get your lazy aboriginal ass up off the couch." Gran also plays her favorite game with the boys called "gotcha," in which she tricks one of the inmates into believing that he's about to be released, and practical jokes that an inmate has gotten the news he'll be executed via the Electric Chair, then says "Gotcha." She also keeps them entertained with "Friday Night Song Night," where she performs various songs. Gran forms a close bond with new inmate Talib (Jake Glass), who was sent to the Garingal Juvenile Justice Centre for "wanking a dog." She tries to help make his life easier as the others bully and harass him for being too quiet and reserved. Gran reveals to Talib that she has Alzheimer's disease after he claims his mother doesn't visit him because she hates him and in a bid to get him to open up to her.

Later on, her guinea pig Kerri-Anne is found dead near the guinea pig hutches. Believing that Talib caused her death, the other inmates bully him more than ever.  Finally pushed to his limit, he beats up another named inmate Marlon and Gran is forced to give him two days in solitary confinement. Gran mistakenly gives Talib and Justin, another solitary confinement inmate, extra bed sheets, which Justin uses for a suicide attempt. Now worried that Talib will do the same, Gran removes him from solitary confinement early.  Garingal's head officer informs her that she must retire due to her worsening Alzheimer's symptoms as evidenced by her unwitting enabling of Justin's botched suicide attempt. She moves to Dunt to live with her family.

Blake Oakfield 
Blake Oakfield is a 38-year-old former champion surfer from the fictional town of Narmucca Bay, New South Wales, now a husband and a stepfather of two. He's dedicated to the surf gang he founded as a young man, the Mucca Mad Boys. Many of Narmucca's locals dislike him and his gang because they're known to cause trouble. Oakfield feels that his surfing career wasn't the same after he had his testicles shot and amputated after a gang fight with their enemy, the Fennel Hell Men, so he quit. He claims that his current occupation is keeping Narmucca Bay safe from the Fennel Hell Men.

During the show Oakfield sets up a Fat Boys Surf School to not only teach young boys to enjoy the beauty of the ocean and to improve their confidence. But when one of the boys gets injured, Oakfield cancels the school. He ends up getting arrested after wrongly being accused of shooting Packo (Gareth Haeberle), the Fennel Hell Men's leader. His pregnant wife Kareena (Sarah Sutherland) eventually leaves him and goes to Sydney with their children. Oakfield's mate Hunter (Paul Pearson) moves in with him and he and the other Mucca Mad Boys try to cheer up Oakfield, who is distraught about losing his family.

After attending the court case hearing with Packo, it is revealed that Oakfield's mate and former Mucca Mad Boy member, Ashley (Christian Stack), was responsible for the shooting and is sent back to prison. Oakfield undergoes the artificial testicles operation and reopens the Fat Boys Surf School with the other Mucca Mad Boys members helping out. Kareena also returns and has already given birth to their third child, Tyrone. Oakfield decides to surf again and wants to do the Billabong Legends of Surfing Tour. He believes that his new artificial testicles have made him confident again.

Other characters 
Kerry (Debbie Jones) – Daniel and Nathan's mother.
Steve (Greg Fairall) – Kerry's husband, Daniel and Nathan's step-father.
Tyson (Liam Keltie) – Daniel and Nathan's younger brother.
Jamie (Samuel Cooke) – Daniel and Nathan's younger brother.
Julia (Virginia Cashmere) – Daniel and Nathan's younger sister.
Tim Okazaki (Jordan Dang) – The son of Jen Okazaki. Jen is Tim's manager and she trains and pushes him into becoming a skateboarding champion. Jen markets him as a cute Japanese boy and a homosexual. However, during the show Tim reveals he's actually American, speaks with a fake Japanese accent, and is not gay at all. Tim struggles to reconcile his mother with the desire to be a normal teenager.
Danthony (Clyde Boraine) – S.mouse's best friend. He spends most of his time hanging out with S.mouse, and also is his producer when S.mouse is dropped by his record label.
Lasquisha (Kristin Dione Metoyer) – S.mouse's girlfriend until episode 10.
Shwayne Senior (Richard Lawson) – S.mouse's father.
Talib (Jake Glass) – A new inmate at the Garingal Juvenile Justice Centre who rarely speaks. He is constantly bullied by the other inmates for masturbating a dog and is known as a "Dog Wanker". During the show, Talib forms a close bond with Gran.
Kareena (Sarah Sutherland) – Blake's wife and mother of three. Kareena was pregnant over the majority of the series, but by the final episode she had already given birth to their third child, Tyrone.
Hunter (Paul Pearson) – Blake's best mate and the second founding member of the surf gang, the Mucca Mad Boys. He is often found hanging out with Blake and has a Mucca Mad Boys tattoo.
Penny (Alison Roy) – Works at the Garingal Juvenile Justice Centre. Penny is often nicknamed "Legs" due to her extreme height. She used to live and work with Gran, before Gran was forced to leave.

Episodes

Merchandise 
S.mouse's song "Animal Zoo" was made available for digital download on the Australian iTunes Store on 26 May 2011. Another one of his songs, "Slap My Elbow" was released on 8 June 2011. The song debuted at number 93 on the Australian ARIA Singles Chart on 13 June 2011, and peaked at number 37 the following week. It also peaked at number 13 on the ARIA Urban Singles Chart. S.mouse's third single, "Squashed Nigga", was released on 21 July 2011. It debuted at number 22 on the ARIA Urban Singles Chart, and has since peaked at #18.

Following the broadcast of the last episode on 27 July 2011, the series' soundtrack was released the next day. It featured seventeen of S.mouse's songs, as well as the Angry Boys opening theme song, and nineteen videos. The album debuted at number 75 on the ARIA Albums Chart (on which it has since entered the top 50 and peaked at #36), and number 16 on the ARIA Urban Albums Chart, where it has since peaked at #9. The series was also released on DVD, featuring twelve of its episodes, deleted scenes, bloopers, and S.mouse music videos. The soundtrack would win the ARIA Award for Best Original Soundtrack Album on 27 November 2011.

Australian broadcast

Reception 
Angry Boys has received generally negative reviews. The show's premiere was highly anticipated, with "Angry Boys" and "Gran" becoming worldwide trending topics on Twitter as the first episode went to air. It was met with enthusiasm by many, who declared it "worth the wait", but others complained about excessive swearing and a general lack of funniness. It was also criticised on talkback radio the next day, with some callers describing it as "racist, homophobic, and offensive". Among critics, the premiere episode also garnered a mixed reception. Karl Quinn of The Age wrote, "Chris Lilley's Angry Boys is bold, aggressive, unafraid to trample on some very shaky ground. But on the basis of last night's opening episode, it's hard to conclude that it's especially funny. Yet." Darren Devlyn of News.com.au said that it had "flashes of artistic brilliance" but felt "disappointed that there weren't more laughs." Holly Byrnes and Shoba Rao of The Daily Telegraph praised the show, writing, "pushing the boundaries of political correctness to breaking point, Lilley has delivered exactly what his fans expect – and why TV critics have hailed him an 'outrageous comic genius'." However, they also expressed concerns that younger viewers would not grasp the show's satirical nature.

Ratings 
The premiere episode of Angry Boys achieved an audience of 1,368,000. It also served as ABC1's most popular program of 2011. The second episode saw a slight drop in ratings with 1,346,000 viewers, although the series remained the highest-rated show in its timeslot. The third episode only managed 805,000 viewers and placed fourteenth overall for the night. It aired simultaneously with the State of Origin Rugby League, which topped the nights overall ratings.

The fourth episode reached an audience of 920,000. The fifth episode only managed 848,000 viewers and placed sixteenth overall for the night. The sixth episode had 569,000 viewers tuning in. The seventh episode picked up slightly in viewers from the previous week with 634,000 tuning in, however, the eighth episode dropped to 591,000 viewers. The ninth episode reached an audience of 391,000, becoming the lowest ratings for an episode of the series, although it aired against the third and final State of Origin game for 2011, which achieved close to 2.5 million viewers nationwide. The tenth episode picked up slightly with 453,000 viewers and was ranked twenty-third overall. The eleventh episode achieved an audience of 465,000. The twelfth and final episode picked up slightly in viewers from the previous four weeks, with 612,000 viewers tuning in.

International syndication

DVD and Blu-ray release

References

External links

Angry Boys – ABC TV
Angry Boys – HBO

2011 Australian television series debuts
2011 Australian television series endings
2010s Australian comedy television series
2010s Australian television miniseries
2010s LGBT-related comedy television series
Australian Broadcasting Corporation original programming
Australian LGBT-related television shows
Australian mockumentary television series
Cross-dressing in television
English-language television shows
HBO original programming
Race-related controversies in television
Television series about brothers
Television series about dysfunctional families
Television series about twins
Television shows set in Victoria (Australia)
Works about twin brothers